Seneca High School is a high school which serves the townships of Greene, Greenfield, Venango, and Amity in Erie County, Pennsylvania.

Also includes Wattsburg Area Middle School (WAMS) and Wattsburg Area Elementary Center (WAEC)

Public high schools in Pennsylvania
Schools in Erie County, Pennsylvania